Yuen Yuen Ang is a Singaporean-American professor of political science and the author of two books: How China Escaped the Poverty Trap (2016) and China's Gilded Age (2020). How China Escaped the Poverty Trap (Cornell Studies in Political Economy) was named one of the "Best Books of 2017" by the academic journal Foreign Affairs.

Career and research
Ang was born in Singapore. She studied at Colorado College and received a Ph.D. in political science from Stanford University in 2010. She was an assistant professor at the School of International and Public Affairs, Columbia University in 2010–2011, and in 2011 became an associate professor of political science at the University of Michigan. On January 12, 2023, she became the first new named professor at the Center for Economy and Society (CES) and the Department of Political Science in the Krieger School of Arts and Sciences at Johns Hopkins University.

Ang's research focuses on the interaction between industrial development, technological innovation, and political structures, with an emphasis on China.

She is also active in public policy debates, and her opinion columns have been published by Foreign Affairs and Project Syndicate, among others.

She has been interviewed on Freakonomics Radio and the Ezra Klein Show, among other outlets.

Books
 How China Escaped the Poverty Trap, Cornell University Press: Cornell Studies in Political Economy, 2016
 China's Gilded Age: The Paradox of Economic Boom and Vast Corruption, Cambridge University Press, 2020

Awards
 2017 Peter Katzenstein Book Prize
 2018 Andrew Carnegie Fellow for "high-caliber scholarship that applies fresh perspectives to the most pressing issues of our times"
 2020 Theda Skocpol Prize, awarded by the American Political Science Association for "impactful contributions to the study of comparative politics"
 2022 Douglass North Best Book Prize, awarded by the Society for Institutional and Organizational Economics

Notes

References

Ang
Ang